The Singapore University of Social Sciences (SUSS) is a public autonomous university in Singapore. Established in 2017, SUSS focuses on applied degree programmes primarily in the social sciences. In 2017, SUSS received its inaugural class of 2,137 graduates.

SUSS academia is organised into five schools, Institute for Adult Learning (IAL), College for Lifelong & Experiential Learning (CLEL) and four centres.

The chancellor of the university is Stephen Lee Ching Yen. The president of the university is Tan Tai Yong and the provost is Robbie Goh.

The university is located at 463 Clementi Road (Clementi, Singapore). SUSS also uses external premises to conduct lessons.

History

SIM University (2005–2017)

In 2005, SIM University (UniSIM) was a private university under the Singapore Institute of Management Group (SIM) established by Cham Tao Soon who became the first chancellor and chairman of UniSIM.

On 11 November 2016, the SIM governing council voted in favour to bring the university under the ambit of the Ministry of Education.

UniSIM Certificates
In 2017, SUSS conducted an exercise to issue SUSS certificates for those who was conferred with UniSIM certificates. A statement will indicate that the qualifications had been received under the former's name.

Singapore University of Social Sciences Bill
In 2017, then-minister for education Ong Ye Kung moved a bill in Parliament to confer SUSS autonomous status. This signalled the government's support for SUSS and was intended to assure the public of SUSS’ credibility and standing. It also enabled the government to lead SUSS to meet national education objectives, economic and social development while monitoring its financial performances.

SUSS Convocation 2017
In 2017, SUSS marked its inaugural graduation as an Autonomous University, with the first batch of SUSS graduates receiving degrees in the name of SUSS.

SUSS Ministerial Forum 2019
In September 2019, SUSS organised its first ministerial forum where Prime Minister Lee Hsien Loong was invited to share about the role of education and the future of Singapore.

Restructuring process

From 17 March 2017, SIM University was renamed as Singapore University of Social Sciences (SUSS) and brought under the ambit of Ministry of Education. The autonomous status was officially awarded by the Singapore government on 11 July 2017.

The university will restructure to retain a "limited offering" in business and engineering programmes while increasing its offerings in social science programmes. All programmes will have curricula considering the social impacts on the community and have to partake a compulsory module in social sciences. In 2019, SUSS enrolled most students in the areas of social sciences and social services.

From 1 April 2019, IAL was restructured into an autonomous institute within SUSS. They will work together in course design, development and teaching adult students. SUSS will have access to IAL's research findings on the learning needs of students, while IAL will be able to research using SUSS's student data and its adult student learning experience to train adult educators. The university will accredit and issue qualifications on tertiary programmes run by IAL.

Programmes 
In 2014, SUSS (under its former name SIM University) started its full-time programmes that takes on the applied degree pathway with emphasis on practice-oriented teaching. All full-time degree programmes are direct honours degrees and may be completed in 4 to a maximum of 6 years. Programmes offer Professional Major and several Major-Minor combinations.

The Bachelor of Laws programme will take will take about 4.5 to 5 years and the Juris Doctor (JD) programme 4 years. Both are to be completed within 6 years.

Collaborations
SUSS collaborates with overseas universities to offer the following programmes:

Entrepreneurship
The Alibaba Cloud-SUSS Entrepreneurship Programme was launched in July 2017 where students either receive a Certificate or Minor in Entrepreneurship. This programme enables students to learn ideation, validation, building their Minimum Viable Product and pitching for funding.
A series of Impact Startup Challenge were also curated where students travel to foreign countries as a 3 to 5 days entrepreneurship boot camp. SUSS students partners with foreign students to work together on their business idea and prototype. 
One of the teams, Good for Food was featured by Channel News Asia for creating a smart AI dustbin which can help the Food & Beverage sector to track and reduce food waste.

Campus
The campus is on rented premises located at 463 Clementi Road SIM Blk C, Singapore 599494. SUSS also uses external premises at BCA Academy, Nanyang Academy of Fine Arts, Ong Teng Cheong Labour Leadership Institute, NTUC Centre, Physical Education & Sports Teacher Academy, Republic Polytechnic, Singapore Centre for Chinese Language, Singapore Polytechnic and Singapore Sports Hub to conduct lessons.

In 2020, its president Cheong Hee Kiat spoke to the media that SUSS was exploring with the Ministry of Education about a new type of campus that will bring its students and staff under a single roof. Its location has not been confirmed.

A 6-metre tall artwork by sculptor Sun I-Yu named 'Celebrate The Extraordinary' stands on the right side of Richard K.M. Eu Block C. The sculpture was created for the 2015 Southeast Asian Games and donated to SUSS after the event.

Admission
The minimum education requirement is a GCE 'A' level, or Diplomas from the 5 local Polytechnic or 2 local Arts Institutions, or International Baccalaureate (IB) Diploma, or NUS High School Diploma. Applicants with good SAT1 scores may be considered for admission. Certain programmes may require additional admission requirements.

The part-time programmes require applicants to acquire two years of full-time work experience, completed full-time National Service for male applicants or be currently employed on a full-time basis and be at minimum 21 years old.

In 2018, SUSS received 5,700 applications for 700  full-time places. In 2016, 388 applicants competed for 60 places in the Law Programmes. Applicants into the part-time Accountancy programme will be assessed based on academic merit, relevant work experience and communication skills.

Accelerated Pathway Programme
SUSS offers local Polytechnic students who have achieved good academic results to enrol in the Accelerated Pathway Programme. Successful applicants should fulfil 20 credit units of courses from these undergraduate programmes while pursuing their Diploma courses. Upon completion of the Diploma courses and the minimum GPA score for the Accelerated Pathway programme, students will be granted credit recognition when enrolled with SUSS for their undergraduate studies.

Academic schools
The university currently offers more than 80-degree programmes through five schools.

S R Nathan School of Human Development

In 2018, School of Human Development and Social Services was renamed the S R Nathan School of Human Development (NSHD) in honour of Singapore's sixth president, Mr S. R. Nathan’s advocacy of social and community causes when he was the patron of SUSS.

The School offers a range of programmes in Counselling, Early Childhood Education, Human Resource Management and Social Work. The Gerontology programme is offered at the postgraduate level.

School of Business

SUSS School of Business (SBIZ) offers a range of Business and Management programmes. The Bachelor of Accountancy (part-time included) is accredited by the Accounting and Corporate Regulatory Authority (ACRA) and Institute of Singapore Chartered Accountants (ISCA). Similar to accountancy degrees from other Singapore autonomous universities, SUSS Accountancy degrees are eligible for direct entry into the Singapore CA Qualification's professional programme to become a Chartered Accountant of Singapore.

School of Humanities and Behavioural Sciences

SUSS School of Humanities and Behavioural Sciences (SHBS) offers translation and interpretation bachelor's degree programmes. The school also provides certification for Professional Interpreters. In 2018, the School of Arts and Social Sciences (SASS) was renamed the School of Humanities and Behavioural Sciences (SHBS).

School of Law

In January 2017, SUSS School of Law received its first 60 law students under its four-year LLB and JD programmes. Similar to other Singapore autonomous universities, both the LLB and JD programmes are recognised degrees under the Singapore Legal Profession Act and qualified persons with a minimum GPA of 3.5 are eligible to sit for the Bar Examination. The school also offers Master of Taxation in collaboration with the Tax Academy of Singapore.

School of Science and Technology

SUSS School of Science and Technology offers programmes in Aerospace Systems, Biomedical Engineering, Built Environment, Engineering, Military Studies and Technology. The Bachelor of Building and Project Management is accredited by the Singapore Institute of Surveyors and Valuers (SISV) and Royal Institution of Chartered Surveyors (RICS). The BSc Facilities and Events Management is accredited by the International Facilities Management Association (IFMA) and the RICS.

The BEng Aerospace Systems is accredited by the Engineering Accreditation Board (EAB) of Singapore, Institution of Engineers Singapore (IES).

College of Lifelong and Experiential Learning

On 8 September 2018, SUSS launched the College of Lifelong and Experiential Learning (CLEL) which adopts a brand of education known as 'lifelong and experiential learning'. The initiative provides for learning before, during and after University education. SUSS LifE also represents SUSS's open and inclusive admissions approach.

There are three sub-units within CLEL:
Centre for Continuing and Professional Education (CCPE)
Centre for University Core (CUC)  
Centre for Experiential Learning (CEL)

Institute for Adult Learning

In December 2008, the Institute for Adult Learning (IAL) was set up under SkillsFuture Singapore (SSG) to focus on training and developing Continuous Education and Training (CET) adult educators, research in workforce development and lifelong learning; and drive innovations in CET.
On 1 April 2019, IAL was restructured as an autonomous institute within the SUSS.

Centres
C-three offers counselling services for SUSS students at no cost.

The Centre for Applied Research (CFAR) undertakes, administers and facilitates research and related activities. It also serves as an incubation centre for research programmes and projects. CFAR, being SUSS's knowledge hub, maintains a repository of the knowledge output of all faculty, staff and students.

The Centre for Chinese Studies @SUSS (CCS@SUSS), serves as the university's resource centre to monitor trends and developments in the wider Chinese-speaking world.

The Teaching and Learning Centre aims to promote teaching excellence for SUSS' faculty.

Marriage and Baby Bonus scheme
In 2018, SUSS rolled out the Marriage and Baby Bonus scheme in support of marriage and parenthood to their part-time adult students. To qualify, they have to be Singaporeans or Singaporean Permanent Residents who has their marriages registered, or child's birth or adoption on or after July 2018.

Notable alumni and students
Kaesang Pangarep - Entrepreneur and the youngest son of Joko Widodo, the 7th Indonesia president

References

External links

 Singapore University of Social Sciences

 
2017 establishments in Singapore
Educational institutions established in 2017
Education in Singapore
Autonomous Universities in Singapore
Business schools in Singapore